Caucasus Frontier 2008 were military exercises conducted by Russia starting July 5, 2008. The active phase was during the second week of July.

They were held in several regions of the Southern Federal District, including Chechnya, North Ossetia, Ingushetia, Kabardino-Balkaria, and Karachay–Cherkessia.

The units involved were from the North Caucasus Military District, mainly the 58th Army, the 4th Air Force Army, Interior Ministry troops, and border guards. Some 8,000 military personnel, 700 combat vehicles and 30 aircraft were involved.

The stated goals included practicing assistance to Russian peacekeepers in Abkhazia and South Ossetia, drawing protests from the Georgian Foreign Ministry.

The exercises were held less than a month before the 2008 South Ossetia war, and were almost concurrent to joint US-Georgian exercises dubbed Immediate Response 2008.

References 
 RIA Novosti 5 July 2008
 RIA Novosti 15 July 2008
 RIA Novosti 16 July 2008

See also
Caucasus 2009

Military exercises involving Russia